Howellsville is a populated place located in Robeson County in the U.S. state of North Carolina. The elevation is 141 feet. Howellsville is in the Eastern Time Zone (UTC -5 hours) and appears on the Northeast Lumberton U.S. Geological Survey Map.

References

Populated places in Robeson County, North Carolina